Rolla was a French brig launched in 1801 or 1803 (records differ), that came into British hands in 1804. She became a privateer and then a slaver, but before she was able to embark any slaves the French Navy captured her. The British Royal Navy recaptured her and took her into service as HMS Rolla. She served in Sir Home Riggs Popham's attack on Buenos Aires. She returned to Britain in December 1807 and was laid up. The Admiralty sold her in 1810 and she became a merchant vessel. She was last listed in 1826, and may have been lost on the coast of Brazil in 1825.

Career

Merchantman
Rolla entered Lloyd's Register in 1805. However, even before her listing she had received a letter of marque. Captain William Miller received the letter on 23 January 1805. The letter declares a rather large crew, suggesting that her owner, J. Ratcliffe, intended to use her as a privateer. The entry in the 1806 Lloyd's Register gives the name of Rollas master as W. Byass, and her trade as Liverpool-Africa, indicating a slave-trader. Byass received a letter of marque on 24 August 1805. She sailed from Liverpool on 31 August 1805, but as she was on her way to gather slaves in West Africa the Spanish (or the French) captured her.

French navy
Admiral Linois's squadron was on its way back to France from the Indian Ocean when it captured Rolla on either 22 November 1805 or 5 December. On 18 April 1806 Lloyd's List (LL) reported that a privateer had captured Rolla, of Liverpool, and another vessel, off Loango.

Royal Navy
The Royal Navy recaptured Rolla on 21 February at the Cape of Good Hope as she sailed into Table Bay. The British took Rollo and the captain of the prize crew, enseigne de vaisseau Vermet, by surprise and were able to capture some of Linois' letters. Home Popham purchased her there.

Home Popham decided to attack Buenos Aires and sailed there from the Cape of Good Hope. On 21 August the second wave of British vessels, Rolla among them, set sail. Rolla served as a transport, carrying a detachment of the 38th Regiment of Foot.

At Montevideo Rolla apparently served to ferry provisions. In November, Home Popham returned to London to face a court martial for having left the Cape. 

Then in December Rolla was commissioned under Lieutenant Joseph Acott. On 10 February 1807 she sailed to Rio Grande with an army commissary officer aboard to procure provisions from the Portuguese. While Rollo was at Montevideo she suffered from desertions. This was a consequence of the fact that when Popham had drawn on the other vessels in his fleet to man her, their captains sent over their worst men.

Between 24 and 28 June Rolla was part of the fleet that moved the troops from Montevideo to attack Buenos Aires. After the British defeat, on 9 July Rolla sailed for Montevideo. 

Rolla was docked at Portsmouth between 7 November and 4 December 1807. She then disappears from records, suggesting that she was laid up. Furthermore, on 13 February 1808 the Navy launched a new . As the Navy tended to avoided having two serving vessels sharing a name, the reuse of the name is consistent with the first Rolla no longer being active.

Disposal
The "Principal Officers and Commissioners of His Majesty's Navy" offered "Rolla, lying at Portsmouth", for sale on 24 March 1810. she sold there on that day.

Merchantman again, and fate
Rolla re-entered Lloyd's Register (LR) in 1811. She then sailed under various masters and to a variety of different destinations. From 1818 on her master was listed as Cowley, her owner as Hancock, and her trade Liverpool-Brazil. Lloyd's List reported that on 7 December 1817 "The Rolla, Cowley, had sailed from Paraimbo for Liverpool...and has not since been heard of." However, Rolla continued to be listed and occasionally there were mentions of a Rolla in Lloyd's List.

Notes, citations, and references
Notes

Citations

References
 
 
 
 
  
 

1800s ships
Ships built in France
Captured ships
Liverpool slave ships
Brigs of the Royal Navy
Age of Sail merchant ships
Merchant ships of the United Kingdom
Maritime incidents in November 1825